The Office of the First Minister was a portfolio within the Scottish Government. The office was responsible for the running of the government.

Executive agencies 
The Historic Scotland and National Archives of Scotland Executive agencies came under the Office's remit.

Notes

External links 
Scottish Government

Defunct departments of the Scottish Government
Government agencies established in 1999
1999 establishments in Scotland